The Israel men's national under 20 ice hockey team is the national under-20 ice hockey team of Israel. The team is controlled by the Ice Hockey Federation of Israel, a member of the International Ice Hockey Federation. Israel first played at the 1997 World Junior Championships, but did not return until 2016.

History
Israel played its first game during the 1997 World Junior Ice Hockey Championships. They were placed in Pool D with the games being held in Sofia, Bulgaria. Israel's first game was against Estonia which they lost 12–3. The game is also recorded as Israel's largest ever loss. Within Pool D Israel was drawn into a preliminary group against Estonia, South Africa, and Yugoslavia. They finished the preliminary round in third place after managing to win their game against South Africa. Based on the positions in the preliminary round the teams were then drawn into placement games against the other preliminary group. Israel was drawn into the placement game for fifth place against the hosts Bulgaria. They won the game 7–3, which is also their largest ever win in international participation.

After leaving the U20 level for several years, the team returned to the tournament for 2016. Playing in Division III, the lowest tier, they finished fourth out of the seven teams. The following year Israel finished fifth. They won the 2018 tournament, and were promoted to Division IIB for 2019. A fifth-place finish ensured they stayed in Division IIB for 2020.

International competitions

 1997 – 31st place (5th place in Pool D)
 2016 – 38th place (4th in Division III)
 2017 – 39th place (5th in Division III)
 2018 – 35th place (1st in Division III)
 2019 – 33rd place (5th in Division IIB)
 2020 – 34th place (6th in Division IIB)

See also
 Ice hockey in Israel
 Israel national ice hockey team
 Israeli League (ice hockey)

References

External links
Ice Hockey Federation of Israel 

I
Junior national ice hockey teams